Bigg Boss Bangla 1 is the first season of the Bangali version of the Indian reality show Bigg Boss. It started on 17 June 2013 and concluded on 14 September 2013 with Aneek Dhar as the winner.

Housemates status

Housemates

Original contestants
 Iris Maity – Actress. 
 Rudranil Ghosh – Actor. 
 Aneek Dhar – Singer.
 Kais Kalim – Gym Trainer. 
 Koneenica Banerjee – Actress. 
 Mahesh Jalan – Astrologer. 
 Mallika Majumdar – Actress. 
 Sudipta Chakraborty – Actress. 
 Abhijit Burman (Pota) – Singer. 
 Nandini Pal – Presenter. 
 Manabi Banerjee – Author. 
 Sampurna Lahiri – Model, Film Actress. 
 Vikram Chatterjee – Film & Television Actor.

Wildcard entrants
 Kartik Das Baul
 Carlyta Mouhini

Nominations table

Nomination notes

References

2013 Indian television seasons
Colors Bangla original programming